Polygrammodes mimetica is a moth in the family Crambidae. It was described by Eugene G. Munroe in 1960. It is found in Panama and Costa Rica.

References

Spilomelinae
Moths described in 1960
Moths of Central America